In mathematics, the John ellipsoid or Löwner-John ellipsoid E(K) associated to a convex body K in n-dimensional Euclidean space Rn can refer to the n-dimensional ellipsoid of maximal volume contained within K or the ellipsoid of minimal volume that contains K. 

Often, the minimal volume ellipsoid is called as Löwner ellipsoid, and the maximal volume ellipsoid as the John ellipsoid (although John worked with the minimal volume ellipsoid in its original paper). One also refer to the minimal volume circumscribed ellipsoid as the outer Löwner-John ellipsoid and the maximum volume inscribed ellipsoid as the inner Löwner-John ellipsoid.

Properties 
The John ellipsoid is named after the German-American mathematician Fritz John, who proved in 1948 that each convex body in Rn is circumscribed by a unique ellipsoid of minimal volume and that the dilation of this ellipsoid by factor 1/n is contained inside the convex body. 

The inner Löwner-John ellipsoid E(K) of a convex body K ⊂ Rn is a closed unit ball B in Rn if and only if B ⊆ K and there exists an integer m ≥ n and, for i = 1, ..., m, real numbers ci > 0 and unit vectors ui ∈ Sn−1 ∩ ∂K such that

and, for all x ∈ Rn

Applications
Computing Löwner-John ellipsoids has applications in obstacle collision detection for robotic systems, where the distance between a robot and its surrounding environment is estimated using a best ellipsoid fit. 

It also has applications in portfolio optimization with transaction costs.

See also 

 
 Steiner inellipse, the special case of the inner Löwner-John ellipsoid for a triangle.
 Fat object, related to radius of largest contained ball.

References

 

Convex geometry
Multi-dimensional geometry